Peter Larisch (born 13 September 1950) is an East German former handball player who competed in the 1972 Summer Olympics.

He was born in Goldberg.

In 1972 he was part of the East German team which finished fourth in the Olympic tournament. He played one match and scored two goals.

External links
profile

1950 births
Living people
People from Ludwigslust-Parchim
German male handball players
Sportspeople from Mecklenburg-Western Pomerania
Olympic handball players of East Germany
Handball players at the 1972 Summer Olympics